Nagapattinam is a town in the Indian state of Tamil Nadu.

Nagapattinam may also refer to:
 Nagapattinam district, a coastal district of Tamil Nadu state in southern India
 Nagapattinam (Lok Sabha constituency), a Lok Sabha constituency in Tamil Nadu
 Nagapattinam (State Assembly Constituency), a state assembly constituency in Tamil Nadu
 Nagapattinam division, a revenue division of Nagapattinam district in Tamil Nadu, India
 Nagapattinam taluk, a taluk of Nagapattinam district of the Indian state of Tamil Nadu
 Nagapattinam block, a revenue block in the Nagapattinam taluk of Nagapattinam district, Tamil Nadu, India